John Trotter may refer to:

John Trotter (painter) (1752–1792), Irish painter
John Trotter (MP) (died 1856), British Member of Parliament for West Surrey
John Trotter Brockett (1788–1842), British attorney, antiquarian, numismatist, and philologist
Henry John Trotter (1835–1888), English barrister, railway director and Conservative politician
John Trotter (Fijian politician) (died 1954), Australian member of the Fijian Legislative Council
John Scott Trotter (1908–1975), American musical conductor and arranger known for his work with Bing Crosby
John K. Trotter (born 1934), American lawyer, judge, and mediator
John Trotter (drummer) (born 1966), drummer with Manfred Mann's Earth Band

See also 
 Trotter (disambiguation)